The 1984 Linfield Wildcats football team was an American football team that represented  Linfield University and won the national championship during the 1984 NAIA Division II football season. In their 17th season under head coach Ad Rutschman, the Wildcats compiled a perfect 12–0 record and won the Northwest Conference (NWC) championship.

Schedule

References

Linfield Wildcats
Linfield Wildcats football seasons
NAIA Football National Champions
College football undefeated seasons
Linfield Wildcats football